The John J. Swearingen House (also known as the R.H. Langford House) is a historic home in Bartow, Florida. It is located at 690 East Church Street. On May 13, 1982, it was added to the U.S. National Register of Historic Places.

References

External links
 Polk County listings at National Register of Historic Places
 Polk County listings at Florida's Office of Cultural and Historical Programs

Houses on the National Register of Historic Places in Florida
National Register of Historic Places in Polk County, Florida
Buildings and structures in Bartow, Florida
Houses in Polk County, Florida
1923 establishments in Florida
Houses completed in 1923